George K. Tanham (1922-2003) joined the American RAND Corporation in 1955 and held several positions before retiring in 1987, including leading Project AIR FORCE from 1970 to 1975. He also served on the RAND Board of Trustees and was an advisory trustee at the time of his death. He continued to write on international security issues, especially regarding South Asia, after his retirement.

Tanham's career in government included serving as associate director for counterinsurgency of the U.S Agency for International Development in South Vietnam from 1964 to 1965, and as special assistant for counterinsurgency to the American ambassador in Thailand from 1968 to 1970.

A native of Tenafly, New Jersey, Tanham was a graduate of Princeton University. He served as an artillery officer in Europe during World War II and was a decorated combat veteran. After receiving his Ph.D. in history and political science from Stanford University, he taught military history at Caltech before joining RAND.

In the course of his career, Tanham received numerous fellowships and grants; served on various U.S. government committees; was editor-in-chief of the journal Studies in Conflict and Terrorism; and wrote several books.

1922 births
2003 deaths
People from Tenafly, New Jersey
Princeton University alumni
Stanford University alumni
American military personnel of World War II
American expatriates in Vietnam